Alchemilla rupestris, synonym Lachemilla rupestris, is a species of plant in the family Rosaceae. It is endemic to Ecuador. Alchemilla rupestris has lateral segments of leaves with yellow-brown membranaceous basal stipules on it. The flowers have 2-4 carpels that are 2.5-3 mm long.

References

rupestris
Endemic flora of Ecuador
Vulnerable plants
Taxonomy articles created by Polbot